Codex Sinaiticus Rescriptus mostly originating in Saint Catherine’s Monastery, Sinai (Sinai, Georg 34; Tsagareli 81) is an accumulation of sixteen or even eighteen Christian Palestinian Aramaic palimpsest manuscripts containing Old Testament, Gospel and Epistles pericopes of diverse Lectionaries, various unidentified homilies and one by John Chrysostom, hagiographic texts as the Life of Pachomios, the Martyrdom of Philemon Martyrs, and the Catecheses by Cyril of Jerusalem. The manuscripts are recycled parchment material that were erased and reused by the tenth century Georgian scribe Ioane-Zosime for overwriting them with homilies and a Iadgari (979-980 AD). Part of the parchment leaves (Sinai, Geog. 34) had been brought by him from the Monastery of Saint Sabas, south of Jerusalem, when he moved to St Catherine’s Monastery and became there librarian. In the nineteenth century most of the codex was removed from the monastery at two periods. C. Tischendorf took two thirds in 1855 and 1957 with the Codex Sinaiticus to St Peterburg and handed it over to the Imperial Library, now the National Library of Russia, and the remaining third left on a clandestine route and found its way into various European and later also into US collections, at present in a Norwegian collection. From the New Finds of 1975 in the Monastery of Saint Catherine missing folios of some of the underlying manuscripts could be retrieved (Sinai, Georgian NF 19; 71).

Manuscripts
 CSRa Lectionary with Old Testament and Epistles pericopes
 CSRb Lectionary with Old Testament, Gospel and Epistles pericopes
 CSRc Lectionary with Gospel pericopes
 CSRd Lectionary with Gospel pericopes
 CSRe Lectionary with Gospel pericopes
 CSRf Gospel manuscript
 CSRg Gospel manuscript
 CSRh Praxapostolos (Acts of the Apostles)
 CSRi Catecheses of Cyril of Jerusalem 
 CSRj Unknown homily (Ezechiel 3:18; 33:13); John Chrysostom’s homily of the Prodigal Son
 CSRk Unknown homily (1 Kingdoms 17)
 CSRl Vita of Pachomios (Paralipomena)
 CSRm Martyrdom of Philemon
 CSRn Unidentified
 CSRo Unidentified
 CSRp Unidentified
 [CSRq] Dormition of the Mother of God Transitus Mariae 
 [CSRr] Dormition of Mother of God Transitus Mariae(unclear classification)

References

Text editions
 Jan Pieter Nicolaas Land, Anecdota Syriaca IV (Leiden, 1875), pp. 177–233 [Latin], 103–224 [Syropalestinian], pls. I–VI.
 Hugo Duensing, Christlich-palästinisch-aramäische Texte und Fragmente (Göttingen, 1906). 
 Hugo Duensing, Nachlese christlich-palästinisch aramäischer Fragmente, NAWG, phil.-hist. Kl. 5 (Göttingen, 1955).
 Hugo Duensing, Neue christlich-palästinische-aramäische Fragmente, NAWG, phil.-hist. Kl. 9 (Göttingen, 1944).
 Christa Müller-Kessler and Michael Sokoloff, The Christian Palestinian Aramaic Old Testament and Apocrypha, Corpus of Christian Palestinian Aramaic, I (Groningen, 1997). 
 Alain Desreumaux, Codex sinaiticus Zosimi rescriptus, Histoire du Texte Biblique 3 (Lausanne, 1997).  
 Christa Müller-Kessler and Michael Sokoloff, The Christian Palestinian Aramaic New Testament Version from the Early Period. Gospels, Corpus of Christian Palestinian Aramaic, IIA (Groningen, 1998). 
 Christa Müller-Kessler and Michael Sokoloff, The Christian Palestinian Aramaic New Testament Version from the Early Period. Acts of the Apostles and Epistles, Corpus of Christian Palestinian Aramaic IIB (Groningen, 1998). 
 Christa Müller-Kessler and Michael Sokoloff, The Catechism of Cyril of Jerusalem in the Christian Palestinian Aramaic Version, A Corpus of Christian Palestinian Aramaic, V (Groningen, 1999). 
 Christa Müller-Kessler, Codex Sinaiticus Rescriptus. A Collection of Christian Palestinian Aramaic Manuscripts, Le Muséon 127, 2014, pp. 263–309.

Further reading
 Nina Pigoulewski, Manuscrits syriaques bibliques de Léningrad (suite), Revue Biblique 46, 1937, pp. 556–562, pls. XIV–XV.
 Nina Viktorovna Pigulevskaja, Katalog Sirijskiy rukopisej Leningrada, Moskva (Palestinskij sbornik Vypusk 6, 69; Leningrad, 1960), no. VI, p. 21; no. XVII p. 55; no. XXXI p. 109; Ris. 5 p. 111.
 G. Garitte, Addendum: le codex sin. Géor.81(Tsag.), Le Muséon 80, 1967, pp. 90–92.
 Michel van Esbroeck, Les manuscrits de Jean Zosime Sin. 34 et Tsagareli 81, Bedi Kartlisa 39, 1981, pp. 63–75.   
 Sebastian P. Brock, Catalogue of the “New Finds” in St. Catherine Monastery, Sinai (Athens, 1995). 
 Christa Müller-Kessler, Christian Palestinian Aramaic and Its Significance to the Western Aramaic Group, Journal of the American Oriental Society 119, 1999, pp. 631–636.
 Sebastian P. Brock, Review of Alain Desreumaux, Codex sinaiticus Zosimi rescriptus (Histoire du Texte Biblique 3; Lausanne, 1997), in Journal of Theological Studies 50, 1999, pp. 763–767.
 Olga V. Vasilieva, Christian Manuscripts of the East in the National Library of Russia, Manuscripta Orientalia 13, 2007, pp. 24–54.
 Alain Desreumaux, L’apport des palimpsestes araméens christo-palestiniens:  le case du Codex Zosimi Rescriptus et du Codex Climaci rescriptus, in V. Somers (ed.), Palimpsestes et éditions de textes: les textes littéraires, Publications de l’Institut Orientaliste de Louvain, 56 (Louvain, 2009), pp. 201–211. 
 Sebastian P. Brock, The Syriac New Finds at St. Catherines’s Monastery, Sinai, and Their Significance, The Harp 27, 2011, pp. 39–52.
 Sebastian P. Brock, Sinai: a Meeting Point of Georgian with Syriac and Christian Palestinian Aramaic, in Jean-Pierre Mahé et al. (eds.), The Caucasus between East and West (Tbilisi, 2012), pp. 482–494.
 Sebastian P. Brock, Ktabe Mpassqe. Dismembered and Reconstituted Syriac and Christian Palestinian Aramaic Manuscripts: Some Examples, Ancient and Modern, Hugoye. Journal of Syriac Studies 15, 2012, pp. 7–20.
 Christa Müller-Kessler, Codex Sinaiticus Rescriptus. A Collection of Christian Palestinian Aramaic Manuscripts, Le Muséon 127, 2014, pp. 263–309.

See also 

 Biblical manuscript
Codex Sinaiticus
 Differences between codices Sinaiticus and Vaticanus
 Fifty Bibles of Constantine
 Lectionary
 List of New Testament uncials

External links
 Sinai Palimpsest Project at the Monastery of Saint Catherine, Sinai.
 Codex Sinaiticus at the National Library of Russia, St Petersburg.

6th-century biblical manuscripts
Saint Catherine's Monastery
Palimpsests
New Testament apocrypha